Jean Neill Erwin  (25 January 1890 – 24 July 1969) was a New Zealand civilian and military nurse, masseuse, and army nursing administrator. She was born in Fendalton, Christchurch, New Zealand on 25 January 1890. She was appointed a Member of the Order of the British Empire (MBE) in the 1945 King's Birthday Honours just after her retirement from the military. She was an elder at Knox Church in Christchurch.

In July 1915, Erwin enlisted in the New Zealand Army Nursing Service and was posted overseas. In October that year, she was aboard the SS Marquette when it was torpedoed by a German submarine and sunk. Ten New Zealand nurses lost their lives, but Erwin and other survivors continued to serve in hospitals and hospital ships for the remainder of World War I. After the war had ended, she continued as a nurse in England before returning to New Zealand in 1920.

References

1890 births
1969 deaths
New Zealand nurses
New Zealand military personnel
New Zealand Members of the Order of the British Empire
Female nurses in World War I
Sinking of the SS Marquette
New Zealand women nurses